Bernard Tissier de Mallerais  (born 14 September 1945) is a French Traditionalist bishop of the Society of Saint Pius X.

Pope John Paul II declared that Tissier had incurred an automatic excommunication latae sententiae after he received episcopal consecration without a papal mandate from Archbishop Marcel Lefebvre on 30 June 1988, deemed by the Holy See to be "unlawful" and "a schismatic act". Pope Benedict XVI remitted the excommunication on 21 January 2009.

Early life and ministry 
Tissier de Mallerais was born in Sallanches, Haute-Savoie, France. After obtaining a university degree in biology, he entered the International Seminary of Saint Pius X at Fribourg in October 1969. On June 29, 1975 he was ordained priest by Archbishop Marcel Lefebvre at Écône. He served first as a professor, then as vice-rector, and finally as rector of the seminary at Écône. Then he was appointed Secretary General of the SSPX.

Consecration and excommunication 

In June 1988 Archbishop Marcel Lefebvre announced his intention to consecrate de Mallerais and three other priests (Bernard Fellay, Richard Williamson, and Alfonso de Galarreta) as bishops. Lefebvre did not have a pontifical mandate for these consecrations (i.e. permission from the pope), normally required by Canon 1382 of the Code of Canon Law. On June 17, 1988 Cardinal Bernardin Gantin, prefect of the Congregation for Bishops sent the four priests a formal canonical warning that he would automatically incur the penalty of excommunication if they were to be consecrated by Lefebvre without papal permission.

On June 30, 1988 de Mallerais and the three other priests were consecrated bishop by Archbishop Lefebvre and Bishop Antônio de Castro Mayer. On July 1, 1988 Cardinal Gantin issued a declaration stating that Lefebvre, de Castro Mayer, de Mallerais, and the three other newly-ordained bishops "have incurred ipso facto the excommunication latae sententiae reserved to the Apostolic See."

On July 2, 1988, Pope John Paul II issued the motu proprio Ecclesia Dei, in which he reaffirmed the excommunication, and described the consecration as an act of "disobedience to the Roman pontiff in a very grave matter and of supreme importance for the unity of the Church", and that "such disobedience — which implies in practice the rejection of the Roman primacy — constitutes a schismatic act".
Cardinal Darío Castrillón Hoyos, head of the commission responsible for implementing Ecclesia Dei, has said this resulted in a "situation of separation, even if it was not a formal schism."

The SSPX denied the validity of the excommunications, saying that the consecrations were necessary due to a moral and theological crisis in the Catholic Church.

SSPX bishop

After his episcopal consecration, Tissier de Mallerais continued in his position of Secretary General of the SSPX until 1996. In 1991, he consecrated Licínio Rangel as bishop for the Priestly Society of St. John Mary Vianney after the death of its founder, bishop Antônio de Castro Mayer.

In 1996, he was charged with writing a biography of Archbishop Marcel Lefebvre; the work was published in 2002.

In that same year, the history professor Luc Perrin claimed that he "went as far as to consider the present Roman Catholic Church is not a Christian Church, casting serious doubts on the validity of the 'conciliar' priesthood, calling it a 'gnostic priesthood' (Homily of June 27, 2002)."

By a decree of 21 January 2009 (Protocol Number 126/2009), which was issued in response to a renewed request that Bishop Fellay made on behalf of all four bishops whom Lefebvre had consecrated on 30 June 1988, the Prefect of the Congregation for Bishops, by the power expressly granted to him by Pope Benedict XVI, remitted the alleged automatic excommunication that they had thereby incurred, and expressed the wish that this would be followed speedily by full communion of the whole of the Society of Saint Pius X with the Church, thus bearing witness, by the proof of visible unity, to true loyalty and true recognition of the Pope's Magisterium and authority.

The canonical situation of Bernard Tissier de Mallerais thus became the same as that of the other clergy of the Society, who are suspended a divinis.

Works

 Marcel Lefebvre: The Biography
 Faith Imperiled by Reason: Benedict XVI's Hermeneutics

References

External links

1945 births
Living people
Écône consecrations
French traditionalist Catholics
People from Haute-Savoie
People temporarily excommunicated by the Catholic Church
Members of the Society of Saint Pius X
Traditionalist Catholic bishops
Traditionalist Catholic writers